

Films

References

1961 in LGBT history
LGBT
1961
LGBT
1961